The Union of Mobutuist Democrats is a Mobutist political party in the Democratic Republic of the Congo. It is led by Nzanga Mobutu, a son of former president Mobutu Sese Seko.

UDEMO won 9 out of 500 seats in the 2006 general election. In the 2007 senate election, the party won 1 of 108 seats.

Electoral history

Presidential elections

Parliamentary elections

See also
 Zaire

References

2007 establishments in the Democratic Republic of the Congo
Political parties established in 2007
Political parties in the Democratic Republic of the Congo